The Satin Slipper (Le Soulier de satin) is a long play by the French dramatist and poet Paul Claudel, written in 1929. It was first performed on stage in 1943, in a production by Claudel and Jean-Louis Barrault. Its run time is roughly eleven hours. 

Nowadays it is rarely staged, because of its extreme length and its challenging production requirements. It was made into a film in 1985 by the Portuguese director Manoel de Oliveira.

Plot summary
The scene is set during the Renaissance at the time of the conquistadors.  The play is a love story dominated by the ideas of sin and redemption and the various characters, some divine and some comic, frequently engage in a dialogue as though between Heaven and Earth.

Productions
Full-length productions were staged in Paris and the Avignon Festival and most recently by Olivier Py at the Théâtre de l'Odéon in Paris in 2009.

See also 
Le Monde 100 Books of the Century

References

 Edition critique : Le Soulier de satin by Paul Claudel, Antoinette Weber-Caflisch, Annales littéraires de l'Université de Besançon, n° 334, Les Belles Lettres, 1987.

External links
  

French plays
1929 plays
1943 plays